Line 3 of the Xuzhou Metro is a rapid transit line in Xuzhou city, Jiangsu province, China. It is the third metro line to open in Xuzhou and the line was opened on June 28, 2021.

Stations

References

03
Railway lines opened in 2021